

Events
February 18 – Chinese violinist Vanessa-Mae represents Thailand at the 2014 Winter Olympics in Sochi.
 September 7 – The Qatar Philharmonic Orchestra makes its Proms début. Musical director Han-na Chang resigns the following day.
 November 23 – The Grand finals of Iglesia ni Cristo's Songs of Faith, Love, & Hope: International Singing Competition are held in Philippine Arena.

Albums
2NE1 – Crush
2PM – Genesis of 2PM
AKB48 – Tsugi no Ashiato
Babymetal – Babymetal
Band-Maid - Maid in Japan
BiS – Who Killed Idol?
Buck-Tick – Arui wa Anarchy
Jay Chou – Aiyo, Not Bad
Crayon Pop – Uh-ee  
Donghae&Eunhyuk – Ride Me
Girl's Day – Best Album
Imran Mahmudul – Bolte Bolte Cholte Cholte
Anupam Roy – Bakyobageesh
Ringo Sheena – Gyakuyunyū: Kōwankyoku
Super Junior – Mamacita

Classical
 Unsuk Chin – Clarinet Concerto

Opera
Lei Lei - Visitors on the Icy Mountain

Deaths
January 5 –K. P. Udayabhanu, Indian playback singer, 77 
April 19 – Bashir Ahmad, Bangladeshi playback singer, 73
May 23 - Anand Modak, Indian composer and director, 63 (heart attack)
July 1 – Oscar Yatco, Filipino conductor and violinist, 83
July 5 – Sharifah Aini, Malaysian veteran singer and entertainer, "Biduanita Negara" (National Songstress), 61
September 3 – Habib Wali Mohammad, Pakistani ghazal and film playback singer, 93 
September 7 – Kwon Ri-se, Japanese/South Korean singer (Ladies' Code), 23 (injuries sustained in car accident)
September 19 – Francisco Feliciano,  Filipino composer and conductor, National Artist of the Philippines for Music, 73
October 27 – Shin Hae-chul, South Korean singer (N.EX.T) and record producer, 46 (heart attack)
November 26 – Sabah, Lebanese singer, 87

See also 
2014 in music
2014 in Japanese music
2014 in Philippine music
2014 in South Korean music
List of 2014 albums

References 

Asia
Asian music
2014 in Asia